The following contains the tentative list of the top 10 most watched television interviews on American and British television, with the corresponding average viewership on the network it aired and the year of such broadcast. Almost all of the most watched TV interviews are from the United States, except one from BBC One.

Interviews

See also
 List of most-watched television broadcasts

References

Most watched television interviews
Television interviews
Interviews